The Lloyd Bridges Show is an American anthology drama series produced by Aaron Spelling, which aired on CBS from September 11, 1962, to May 28, 1963, starring and hosted by Lloyd Bridges.

Broadcast history
The Lloyd Bridges Show, a Four Star production, aired on Tuesday at 8 p.m. Eastern time; summer rebroadcasts aired from June to September 3, 1963. The series aired opposite the first season of ABC's military drama Combat!, starring Rick Jason and Vic Morrow, and the last season of NBC's western series Laramie starring John Smith, Robert Fuller, and Spring Byington. It followed rebroadcasts of the half-hour version of CBS's Gunsmoke under the title Marshal Dillon, starring James Arness.

Notable guest stars

 Philip Abbott
 Frank Aletter
 Morgan Brittany
 Edgar Buchanan
 Walter Burke
 John Cassavetes
 Lonny Chapman
 Michael Constantine
 Russ Conway
 Gloria DeHaven
 Don Dubbins
 Norman Fell
 Paul Ford
 Dianne Foster
 Betty Garrett
 Don Gordon
 Harry Guardino
 Glynis Johns
 Carolyn Jones
 Werner Klemperer
 Bethel Leslie
 John Marley
 Lee Meriwether
 Ricardo Montalbán
 Kathleen Nolan
 J. Pat O'Malley
 Jerry Paris
 Paul Richards
 Gena Rowlands
 Reta Shaw
 Robert F. Simon
 Maxine Stuart
 Dub Taylor
 Rhys Williams

Episodes

The Lloyd Bridges Show was a 1962-63 anthology series produced by Aaron Spelling, which ran for 34 episodes. 
Lloyd Bridges appeared in each episode as anthology narrator Adam Shepherd, and was often also one of the characters in the storyline.

References

External links
  
 at CVTA with episode list

1962 American television series debuts
1963 American television series endings
1960s American anthology television series
1960s American drama television series
Black-and-white American television shows
CBS original programming
English-language television shows
Television series by Four Star Television
Television series by 20th Century Fox Television